Ivonne Marie Orsini López (born April 6, 1988, at Bayamón) is a Puerto Rican actress, model and TV personality. Her career began in the pageantry industry, but she has moved into other media. Orsini was one of the hosts of WAPA-TV show ¡Viva la tarde!. Currently, she is now the co-host of the Puerto Rican version of Hoy Día on Telemundo station WKAQ-TV.

Pageantry

Miss World Puerto Rico 2008
Orsini competed in Miss World Puerto Rico 2008, representing San Juan municipality, where she won.

TV roles
Her first major TV appearance was the Spanish reality show Supervivientes.  She moved permanently to Spain in 2009. In 2011 she was selected as the official face for the first Latinamerican TV Channel in the European region.
In 2014, she joined the TV program: "Viva La Tarde" as co-host on WAPA-TV in Puerto Rico. In 2021, she became co-host of the Puerto Rican edition of Telemundo's Hoy Día on WKAQ-TV.

See also

List of Puerto Ricans
History of women in Puerto Rico

References

External links

Miss World 2008 delegates
1988 births
Living people
People from Bayamón, Puerto Rico
Puerto Rican beauty pageant winners
Orsini